Meet the Supremes is the debut studio album by The Supremes, released in late 1962 on Motown.

Background
The LP includes the group's earliest singles: "I Want a Guy", "Buttered Popcorn", "Your Heart Belongs to Me" and "Let Me Go the Right Way". The earliest recordings on this album, done between fall 1960 and fall 1961, feature the Supremes as a quartet composed of teenagers Diana Ross, Mary Wilson, Florence Ballard, and Barbara Martin. Martin left the group in early 1962 to start a family, and the other three girls continued as a trio. Martin is not pictured on the album because of her departure earlier in the year, although her vocals are present on the majority of the recordings on the album (as well as other recordings made during that period). She does have a spoken interlude line (as do the other group members) on the bridge of the song "(He's) Seventeen", and also sings lead on "After All", a song recorded for but not originally included on the album. Along with these songs, Ballard and Wilson are heard out front on other songs as well. Wilson sings lead on "The Tears" (another former non-album track) and "Baby Don't Go"; Ballard has leads on a handful of songs as well (see below), including "Buttered Popcorn" and the short intro line to "Let Me Go the Right Way".

None of these singles charted within the top 40 of the Billboard Pop Singles chart, leading to the group being referred to around the Motown offices as the "no-hit" Supremes. By the time of their next LP, Where Did Our Love Go, the Supremes would have two top 40 hits to their name, one of them, "Where Did Our Love Go", a number-one hit.

Meet The Supremes was originally issued only in monaural sound. A stereo remix of the album, with a new cover, was issued along with the original mono version in 1965. Additionally, a deluxe two compact disc edition was released by Hip-O Select in the spring of 2010, which included both the mono and stereo versions of the album, as well as several outtakes, non-album tracks and live performances.

The original album track order contained ten songs.  Side 1: Your Heart Belongs To Me; Who's Lovin' You; Baby Don't Go; Buttered Popcorn; I Want A Guy.  Side 2:  The Boy That Got Away; You Bring Back Memories; Play A Sad Song; Never Again; (He's) Seventeen.  This configuration was withdrawn to include the current hit, "Let Me Go The Right Way" and the B-side, "Time Changes Things".  "The Boy That Got Away" was withdrawn from the line-up, giving the album 11 tracks.  [Deluxe Version "Meet The Supremes" 2010].

Critical reception

Andrew Hamilton for Allmusic, described "Your Heart Belongs to Me" as 'romantic and sentimental', writing it 'should have been the Supremes' first hit. It's every bit as charming as his chartbusters for Mary Wells.' Hamilton praised The Supremes' vocals, writing, 'Diana Ross' sweet tender lead, assisted by Mary Wilson and Florence Ballard's warm harmonies, could melt icebergs.' Furthermore, Hamilton praised their 'enthusiastic vocals' on "Let Me Go the Right Way". Hamilton also noted 'Ross' vocals on "Who's Lovin' You" are intense and bluesy; Wilson leads the soulful "Baby Don't Go"; and Ballard leads the raucous "Buttered Popcorn," a tune more suited for the Contours.'

Stevie Chick of The Guardian, listed "Buttered Popcorn" as one of the best 10 Supremes songs. Chick expressed that Ballard was 'A bold, big-voiced belter' and described the song as 'A piece of raw, ribald soul lacking the polish that gilded their [The Supremes'] later hits'. Also, 'Ballard growls salaciously on Buttered Popcorn that her boyfriend “likes it greasy, and sticky, and salty, and gooey”, a knowingly saucy performance that somehow escaped the interference of Motown's infamous Quality Control department.' Similarly, Bonnie Stiernberg of Paste wrote 'the innuendo-laced track is not unlike buttered popcorn — salty, fluffy, and oh so good'. Contemporary reviews of "Buttered Popcorn" include a B+ from Cashbox, whilst music columnist Wayne Harada in The Honolulu Advertiser called the song 'A novelty' which 'merits attention'.

On the contrary, Hamilton expressed that on their first recording, "I Want a Guy," 'the backing voices are buried, and Ross' voice sounds whiny and high-pitched', describing "I Want a Guy" and 'the '50s-sounding "He's Seventeen," as 'the only bummers'. More positively, "Time Changes Things" is noted as 'a forerunner to later efforts by Holland-Dozier-Holland',  "Play a Sad Song" is described as a 'torching' ballad 'Blues lovers will relish' and the 'straight '50s doo wop' of "Never Again" drew a comparison to the Chantels.

American music critic Tom Hull noted the album is 'mostly songs by Berry Gordy Jr. or Smokey Robinson,' which 'spawned four singles that went nowhere, although "I Want a Guy" and "Let Me Go the Right Way" are catchy enough.'

Track listing
All lead vocals by Diana Ross except where indicated

Side one
"Your Heart Belongs to Me" (Smokey Robinson) - 2:39
"Who's Lovin' You" (Smokey Robinson) - 2:49
"Baby Don't Go" (Berry Gordy, Jr.) (lead: Mary Wilson) - 2:13
"Buttered Popcorn" (Gordy, Barney Ales) (lead: Florence Ballard) - 2:35
"I Want a Guy" (Gordy, Brian Holland, Freddie Gorman) - 2:53

Side two
"Let Me Go the Right Way" (Gordy) (lead: Diana Ross, Florence Ballard) - 2:32
"You Bring Back Memories" (Robinson) - 2:39
"Time Changes Things" (Brian Holland, Janie Bradford, Lamont Dozier) - 2:33
"Play a Sad Song" (Gordy) - 2:57
"Never Again" (Gordy) - 3:01
"(He's) Seventeen" (Raynoma Liles, Marv Johnson) - 2:47

UK version 
The 1964 UK release has a different tracklisting, featuring songs from the US album releases: Meet The Supremes and Where Did Our Love Go. It also contains the b-side "(The Man With The) Rock & Roll Banjo Band", which would later appear on The Supremes Sing Country, Western and Pop. Following the success of singles "Where Did Our Love Go" and "Baby Love", which peaked at number three and number one in the UK respectively, Meet The Supremes was released in the UK on Stateside (#SL 10109), whilst both singles were still in the top 40 of the UK Singles Chart. Meet The Supremes debuted at number 17 on the UK Albums Chart on December 5, 1964, rising to its peak of number 13, the following week. The album spent a total of 6 weeks in the top 20.

Side one
"Where Did Our Love Go" (Holland-Dozier-Holland) - 2:33
"Your Heart Belongs to Me" (Robinson) - 2:39
"Buttered Popcorn" (Gordy, Ales) (lead: Florence Ballard) - 2:35
"Baby Don't Go" (Gordy) (lead: Mary Wilson) - 2:13
"(The Man With the) Rock and Roll Banjo Band" (Clarence Paul, Gordy)
"I Want a Guy" (Gordy, Holland, Gorman) - 2:53

Side two
"When the Lovelight Starts Shining Through His Eyes" (Holland-Dozier-Holland) - 3:05
"You Bring Back Memories" (Robinson) - 2:39
"Play a Sad Song" (Gordy) - 2:57
"Time Changes Things" (Holland, Bradford, Dozier) - 2:33
"Never Again" (Gordy) - 3:01
"Standing at the Crossroads of Love" (Holland-Dozier-Holland) - 2:27

Early Supremes tracks originally not included on album 
Other tracks that were recorded along the same timeline that could have been included on the album include:
 "The Tears" (Robinson)
 Produced Smokey Robinson, featuring Mary Wilson on lead vocals
 "Save Me a Star" (Gordy, Gwen Gordy Fuqua, Bradford)
 Produced by Berry Gordy, Jr., featuring Florence Ballard on lead vocals
 "Heavenly Father" (Edna McGriff)
 Produced by Berry Gordy, Jr., featuring Florence Ballard on lead vocals
 "Hey Baby" (Gordy)
 Produced by Berry Gordy, Jr., featuring Florence Ballard on lead vocals
 There were 4 different recordings of this song done during this period
 "After All" (Robinson)
 Produced by Berry Gordy, Jr. & Smokey Robinson, a rare track that features all four group members - including early member Barbara Martin - taking a lead verse
"Because I Love Him" (Gordy)
 a cover of Eddie Holland's "Because I Love Her"
 Produced by Berry Gordy, Jr., featuring Diana Ross on lead vocals
 "Tears Of Sorrow" (Richard Morris, Diana Ross, Florence Ballard)
 a cover of the group's Lu Pine Records single (when they were The Primettes)
 Produced by Berry Gordy, Jr., featuring Diana Ross on lead vocals
 "The Boy That Got Away" (Gordy)
 Produced by Berry Gordy, Jr., featuring Diana Ross on lead vocals
 The second pressing of the album with the alternate artwork incorrectly lists this song as being included on side two
 "You're Gonna Come To Me" (Gordy)
 There were 4 different recordings of this song - 3 recordings were done as the group was a quartet, 1 recording was done as the group was a trio
 Produced by Berry Gordy, Jr. (vers. 1-3) or Brian Holland & Lamont Dozier (ver. 4), featuring Diana Ross on lead vocals
 "Those DJ Shows" (Robinson)
 Produced Smokey Robinson, featuring Diana Ross on lead vocals
 "Too Hot" (Gordy)
 Produced by Berry Gordy, Jr., featuring Diana Ross on lead vocals
 There were 4 different recordings of this song done during this period
 "(You Can) Depend On Me" (Gordy, Robinson)
 Produced by Berry Gordy, Jr., featuring Diana Ross on lead vocals
All of these recordings have been released in various Supremes/Motown compilations, and (except for "You're Gonna Come To Me" & "Tears Of Sorrow") were added to the album as bonus tracks in the 2010 CD reissue.

2010 expanded CD bonus track listing
 "Your Heart Belongs To Me" (Live 1962)
 "I Want A Guy" (Live 1962)
 "Time Changes Things" (Live 1962)
 "Let Me Go The Right Way" (Live 1962)
 "After All" (Stereo Mix)
 "(You Can) Depend On Me" (Version 2)
 "The Boy That Got Away" (Alternate Mix)
 "Hey Baby" (Version 2)
 "Too Hot" (Version 1)
 "Buttered Popcorn" (Version 3)
 "Buttered Popcorn" (Version 4)
 "I Want A Guy" (Version 1)
 "Who's Lovin’ You" (Stereo Mix w/Mono Vocal)
 "Because I Love Him" (Version 2)
 "Save Me A Star" (Stereo Mix)
 "Heavenly Father" (Stereo Mix)
 "Those DJ Shows" (Stereo Mix)
 "The Tears" (Stereo Mix)
 "Your Heart Belongs To Me" (Version 1)
 "I'm Giving You Your Freedom" (Alternate Mix) (Holland-Dozier-Holland)
 "Run, Run, Run" (Live 1964) (Holland-Dozier-Holland)
 "Standing At The Crossroads Of Love" (Live 1964) (Holland-Dozier-Holland)
 "Anyone Who Had A Heart" (Live 1964) (Burt Bacharach, Hal David)
 "Time Changes Things" (Live 1964)
 "Make Someone Happy" (Live 1964) (Betty Comden, Adolph Green, Jule Styne)
 "Let Me Go The Right Way" (Live 1964)
 "When The Lovelight Starts Shining Through His Eyes" (Live 1964) (Holland-Dozier-Holland)

Personnel
 Diana Ross, Florence Ballard, Mary Wilson and Barbara Martin - lead and background vocals
 The Funk Brothers - instrumentation
 Berry Gordy - producer (some tracks); executive producer
 Smokey Robinson - producer (some tracks)
 Brian Holland, Lamont Dozier - producers on "Time Changes Things"
 Raymona Liles Gordy - musitron & ondioline instrumentation (some tracks); producer on "(He's) Seventeen"
 Barni Wright - cover design

Singles history
"I Want a Guy" b/w "Never Again" (Tamla 54038, March 9, 1961)
"Buttered Popcorn" b/w "Who's Lovin' You" (Tamla 54045, July 21, 1961; re-recorded version issued in August)
"Your Heart Belongs to Me" b/w "(He's) Seventeen" (Motown 1027, May 8, 1962)
"Let Me Go the Right Way" b/w "Time Changes Things" (Motown 1034, November 22, 1962)

Chart history

References

External links
 

1962 debut albums
The Supremes albums
Motown albums
Albums produced by Smokey Robinson
Albums produced by Berry Gordy
Albums produced by Brian Holland
Albums produced by Lamont Dozier
Albums recorded at Hitsville U.S.A.